Zia ul Mustafa Aazmi Qadri Razvi Amjadi is an Islamic scholar. He is serving as Naa’ib Qaazi ul Quz’zat fil Hind (Deputy Grand Mufti of India) under Mufti Asjad Raza Khan, who is considered to be the Grand Mufti Of India by the Barelvi movement.

Zia al-Mustafa has taught Bukhari and Muslim hadiths for over five decades and was recognized by the Royal Aal al-Bayt Institute for Islamic thought as one of the 500 most influential Muslims in the world in 2016.

Birth and family 
He was born on 28 December 1935 (2nd of Shawwal Hijri 1354) in Ghosi, Uttar Pradesh, India. His father Sadr ush Shariah was Grand Mufti of India and a successor of Mujadid Imam Ahmed Raza Khan Qadri. His birth name was Muhammad Waahid Ali. Allamah Zia ul Mustafa the son of Huzoor Sadr ush Shariah traces his lineage to Maulana Khayrud’deen.

Education 
His father Amjad Ali Aazmi taught him at his home and later he went to study under the scholar Faizul Aarifeen Ghulaam Aasi. He enrolled at Jamia Ashrafia Mubarakpur under Shah Abdul Aziz Muradabadi Mubarakpuri. His teacher Shah Abdul Aziz Muradabadi said, "Whatever I have attained from Huzoor Sadrush Shariah, I have given all of it to Zia ul Mustafa."

Life and services
He was appointed as faculty at Jamia Ashrafia Mubarakpur, Azamgarh, India at the age of 22. He is president of Sharai Council of India and heads annual Fiqahi seminars at Bareilly. He is founder of two Madrasas Taibatul Ulma Jamia Amjadia Rizvia and Kulyatul Banatul Amjadia (for Girls). The institute for girls education was established at the request of his mother Hazra in 1981. Mustafa was appointed as a Deputy grand Mufti of India, in the 16th Annual Fiqahi Seminar in March 2019 held at Bareilly. He has taught several thousand students who have themselves become scholars and are associated with both the Sunni and Sufi movements.

He was considered ‘Mumtaz ul Fuqaha’ at Ashrafia. His famous title is Muhadith E Kabeer.

Books and treaties
He is presently writing a Sharh (commentary) of the famous hadith collection Sunan at-Tirmidhi.

Fatawa writing
He has written several thousands of Fatawas on various topics since his working under Mustafa Raza Khan. He was appointed as successor (khalifa) of Mufti Azam-e-Hind Mustafa Rida Khan also.

Debater or Munazir
According to his official website, he specialized in debate and Ahle Sunnah beliefs and faith and has won famous Debates of Badayun, Banaras and Katihar against Deobandi and Wahhabi scholars. He regularly heads Islamic seminars and conferences all over India and in other parts of the world.

Legacy
One of his students and Islamic scholar Maulana Aftab Moosa Qasim Razvi has established Imam Mustafa Raza Research Centre at Durban, South Africa.

References

External links
 Official website of Allama Ziaul Mustafa

|-

20th-century Muslim scholars of Islam
Indian Sufi religious leaders
Sunni Sufis
Indian Sufis
Barelvis
Islam in India
Qadiri order